Li Jun Li is an American actress, known for her roles as Iris Chang in the ABC series Quantico, Rose Cooper in the Fox series The Exorcist, Jenny Wah in the Netflix series Wu Assassins and Lady Fay Zhu in the period drama Babylon (2022).

Early life

Li was born in Shanghai, China. Her father was a painter, and he moved the family to Bogotá, Colombia, for work when Li was six years old. Three years later, they immigrated to New York City in the United States.

She graduated from Fiorello H. LaGuardia High School's dance program.

Career 
Li had her first break in the acting world starring opposite Matthew Morrison in the Tony Award winning Rodgers and Hammerstein's South Pacific (2008) at New York's Lincoln Center. Following on from this early success, she won roles on a variety of TV shows and films including Blue Bloods (2010), Damages (2011), The Following (2013), Cédric Klapisch's Chinese Puzzle (2013) and Mistress (2014). Li expanded her visibility and presence on a global level by landing major television roles in Neil LaBute's Billy and Billie (2015) and Minority Report (2015) on Fox.

In 2016, Li was cast in the recurring role of FBI recruit, Iris Chang, on the ABC thriller series Quantico. In the same year, she joined the NBC procedural Chicago P.D. in the fourth season.

On July 26, 2017, it was announced by Deadline that Li would join as a series regular in the second season of the Fox television series The Exorcist as Rose Cooper.

On January 15, 2019, it was announced that Li had been cast in the series regular role of Jenny Wah on the Netflix supernatural crime drama series Wu Assassins. In December 2020, she was cast in Damien Chazelle's film Babylon, playing a role inspired by silent film actress Anna May Wong. The film received polarizing reviews, though her performance attracted some praise.

Filmography

Film

Television

References

External links
 

Living people
Actresses from New York City
Actresses from Shanghai
American actresses of Chinese descent
American film actresses
21st-century American actresses
American television actresses
Chinese emigrants to the United States
Chinese emigrants to Colombia
Year of birth missing (living people)